Mary Flaherty may refer to:

Mary Flaherty (baseball) (1926–2000), All-American Girls Professional Baseball League player
Mary Flaherty (politician) (born 1953), former Irish Fine Gael Party politician, TD 1981–1997
Mary Flaherty (EastEnders), fictional character in the popular BBC soap opera EastEnders
Mary Pat Flaherty, American journalist
Mary Flaherty, character in American Wedding